"Me Rehúso" is a song by Venezuelan singer Danny Ocean. The song was released on 16 September 2016, and was re-released on 16 June 2017 through Atlantic Records, due to its late success in Latin America, Europe and the United States. It is the lead single of his debut studio album 54+1. It charted on the Spotify charts of all Latin American countries, being the first song by an independent artist to do so. The song's music video was released in 2017 and has received over 1.4 billion views on YouTube . On 15 June 2017, an English version titled "Baby I Won't" was released.

Background and release
Ocean recorded the song for an old flame on Valentine's Day. He had moved to Miami to escape the turmoil in his homeland, but the woman he liked, still in college at the time, couldn't come with him.  The singer first released the song on YouTube and his main listeners were friends. Then, his manager also showed the song to his wife and Venezuelan TV host Osmariel Villalobos. In June 2017, Ocean inked a deal with Warner Music Group and re-released the song.

Composition
"Me Rehúso" was written by Ocean, It opens "stealthily", with a pair of synthesizers that "vies for one's attention". Their interlocking pattern barely changes, allowing the song to maintain an illusion of stasis. Then, a lone sampled hand drum sound is added around the 40-second mark and a whiff of a reggaeton beat right before one minute has passed; suddenly, Ocean sings in a hungry, scratchy register and multi-tracking his own voice, "transforming his sleek, bare-bones instrumental into a vehicle for a crushing expression of heartache".

Track listings
Digital download
"Me Rehúso" – 3:26

Digital download –  English version
"Baby I Won't" – 3:26

Digital download – English version remix
"Baby I Won't (Cean Remix)" – 3:34

Charts

Weekly charts

Year-end charts

Certifications

Release history

See also
List of number-one songs of 2017 (Mexico)

References

2016 singles